Ralph Anstruther (1921–2002) was a Scottish courtier.

Ralph Anstruther may also refer to:

Sir Ralph Anstruther, 4th Baronet of the Anstruther baronets
Sir Ralph Anstruther, 6th Baronet of the Anstruther baronets